Sima Tirandaz (born 31 August 1970 in Tehran) is an Iranian actress.

Biography
Sima Tirandaz got her bachelor's degree in dramatic literature from Azad University and a master's degree in directing and acting from the Faculty of Cinema and Theater. She started acting in 1988 with the educational shows of the School of Arts and Literature of the Broadcasting and Broadcasting under the supervision of her former director - Adineh Gulab. She made her debut in films by playing a small role in the movie Hamon directed by Dariush Mehrjoei and then she played in the movie Banoo directed by Dariush Mehrjoei. But the shadows of attack was a good opportunity for her to act in this film, and she was nominated for the best actress award from the 11th edition of Fajr Film Festival. Sima Tirandaz married Nasser Hashemi, a radio actress, and after some time they separated, her second marriage was with Majid Nasiri Jozani, an actor in Cold Roads, which also ended in divorce.

Filmography
Dodkesh (TV Mini Series) 
Dracula (TV Series) 
Hot Scent 2018
In the Time of Hangover 2017
Behind the Wall of Silence 2017
Ferrari 2017
Majan 2014
Vrojakha 2014
Keep It Between Us (TV Mini Series) 2013
Roozha-ye Akhar-e Esfand (TV Movie) 2012
Maternal songs (TV Movie) 2012
Maternal Lullabies (TV Movie) 2011
Siomin Rooz (TV Series) 2011
Goodbye 2010
Setayesh Part 1 (TV Series) 2009 
Hot Chocolate 2008
halghe sabz (TV Series) 2007
The Reward of Silence 2004
Khane Dar Tariki (TV Series) 2001
Javani (TV Series) 2000
Azhans doosti (TV Series) 1993
Jaddeye eshgh 1992
Sayeha-ye hojum 1992
The Lady 1990 
Hamoun

Awards
1991 The best actress of the 10th Fajr Theater Festival (Won) 
1992 The best leading actor of the 11th Fajr Film Festival (Nominee)
2001 The best actress of the 20th Fajr Theater Festival (Won)
2006 The best supporting actress of the 11th Khana Cinema festival (Won)
2009 The best actress of the 28th Fajr Theater Festival (Won)

References

 IRIB producing series on Daesh
 'Goodbye', la inmensa película que crea jurisprudencia
https://www.aryanews.com/News/20150624114646374/
https://farsiland.com/cast/sima-tirandaz/
Tirandaz in Persian Wikipedia

External links
 
 
 Filimo
 Namava
 Soureh Cinema

1970 births
Living people
People from Tehran
Actresses from Tehran
Iranian film actresses
Iranian stage actresses
Iranian television actresses
21st-century Iranian actresses